Henri Romans-Petit (13 February 1897 – 1 November 1980) was a member of the French Resistance during the Second World War. He organised several maquis, notably the maquis de l'Ain et du Haut-Jura and the maquis de Haute-Savoie.

Biography
Romans-Petit was born on the 13 February 1897 at Firminy in the Loire département. He was mobilized in 1938. After the armistice, he failed in his attempt to join Free France in London. At Saint-Étienne, he connected with the L'Espoir network affiliated to Franc-Tireur. He was involved in preparing areas for parachute drops around Lyon.

In 1942 Romans-Petit organised the maquis de l'Ain et du Haut-Jura, and on 11 November 1943 he marched in the town of Oyonnax at the head of his maquisards. This fact was said to have decided the English and French forces in London to send arms drops to the French maquisards who were in desperate need of them. An agent of the United Kingdom's clandestine Special Operations Executive, Richard Heslop, arranged the air drops of arms and equipment. 

Romans-Petit was involved in starting maquis in Haute-Savoie, before he passed over his responsibilities to Tom Morel so that he could dedicate himself completely to the Maquis de L'Ain. Over the summer of  1944 Romans-Petit set up a full civil administration at Nantua, and brought La voix du maquis into being. On the liberation of France, he was imprisoned for several weeks at Fort Lamothe at Lyon by the new commissaire de la République, Yves Farge.

Romans-Petit died on the 1 November 1980 at Ceignes in the Ain département.

Works 
 Les Obstinés, Janicot, Lille, 1945.
 L’Appel de l’aventure, Dorian, Saint-Etienne, 1947.
 Les Maquis de l'Ain, Hachette, 1974.

Recognition 
 France: Grand Officier of the Légion d'honneur,  Compagnon de la Libération, Croix de guerre 1914-1918, Croix de guerre 1939-1945, Médaille de la Résistance
 United Kingdom: Distinguished Service Order
 United States of America: Officer of the Legion of Merit
 Belgium: Officier of the Order of Leopold (Belgium)
 Congo: Commander of the Order of Merit
 Cameroon: Officer of the Order of Merit 
 Tunisia: Grand Officier of the Nichan Iftikhar (order of glory) Sources and external links 
 Portrait of Henri Romans-Petit on the Ordre de la Libération site (French) 
 Raymond Ruffin, Ces chefs du Maquis qui gênaient'', Presses de la Cité, 1980.

1897 births
1980 deaths
People from Firminy
French military personnel of World War I
French Resistance members
Grand Officiers of the Légion d'honneur
Companions of the Liberation
Recipients of the Croix de Guerre 1914–1918 (France)
Recipients of the Croix de Guerre 1939–1945 (France)
Recipients of the Resistance Medal
Companions of the Distinguished Service Order
Officers of the Legion of Merit